Catherine Linton (also known as "Young Catherine" or Cathy Linton and later as Catherine Heathcliff then as Catherine Earnshaw) is a character in Emily Brontë's 1847 novel Wuthering Heights.  She is the daughter of Edgar Linton and Catherine Earnshaw. Despite Heathcliff's attempts at exacting revenge on her for the indiscretions of her family, she eventually marries her true love, Hareton Earnshaw. In this way, she establishes equilibrium back in the story.

Story 

Cathy is a very curious and mischievous girl. When thirteen years old, she seeks out Wuthering Heights, the house to which she is not allowed to travel because Heathcliff, Edgar's enemy, resides there.  On arrival she meets Hareton Earnshaw, the nephew of her mother.  Nelly, who travels with her, insists that he is her cousin. Cathy is genuinely amazed and a bit shocked at his coarse, uneducated language, his dirty clothes and his savage manner. She disapproves that there is no way that it could be so.

On her second visit, which Nelly desperately tries to prevent, Heathcliff meets her for the first time. He greets her in a warm and kind manner, although we know that he blames her for the death of his soul mate, her mother.  He tells Nelly that he means no harm; he only wants Cathy and his own son, Linton, to fall in love and be married.  As a result of his encouragement, Cathy and Linton get close to each other.  When Nelly forbids Cathy from visiting Wuthering Heights and the bitter tyrant Heathcliff, Cathy and Linton write love letters to each other.

It soon becomes clear that Heathcliff's plan of their marriage is a part of his endeavour to get revenge from Edgar and his daughter: Catherine will marry Linton, willingly or unwillingly.  Nelly finds the childish love letters and burns them.  Linton's letters are so attractive that most likely Heathcliff wrote them to draw Cathy to the Heights.

Nelly thinks their relationship is over but discovers later that Cathy has been making more visits to Wuthering Heights.

Feeling distressed, Edgar falls ill while Heathcliff keeps Cathy and Nelly at the Heights until Catherine finally agrees to marry Linton.  Desperate to see her father once more before he dies, she consents, and her fate at Wuthering Heights is sealed.  Edgar dies, kissing his daughter on the cheek, knowing that Thrushcross Grange, the Linton household, is now in the hands of his enemy.

Linton, who does not at all resemble his father and is almost like his mother, falls ill as well and dies shortly after his marriage.  Heathcliff forces him in his dying moments to bequeath everything to him, nothing to Catherine.  As a result, it seems that Catherine, now cold and distant because of her understandable misery, is yet another character destined for an unhappy life.

Eventually, an unlikely romance brews between her and Hareton: after long having shrugged off his attempts at winning her affection, she begins to aid him in his education.  Heathcliff sees the love between the two blossom and because he has a grudging soft spot for Hareton, he no longer finds pleasure in degrading them.  Heathcliff begins to see Hareton as an adopted son, as a poor stable boy robbed of his inheritance and love. He no longer stands between Hareton and Catherine, seeing it as a pointless endeavour and revenge against himself, he cannot stop the two lovers any more.

Heathcliff dies and is buried next to Catherine Earnshaw, his true love. Catherine and Hareton make plans to marry on New Year's Day, and to reside at Thrushcross Grange.

Description 
Although she is Cathy Earnshaw's daughter, she resembles her father more in looks, with golden ringlets and fair skin.  The only qualities that she inherits from her mother are the beautiful "Earnshaw eyes" (which also belong to her future husband, Hareton Earnshaw) and her wayward, mischievous spirit.  At first, Catherine is gentle and kind, but a bit snobbish because of her guarded and wealthy upbringing at the Grange; however, when reduced to a life of misery at the Heights, she grows cold, distant, and dismissive of everyone around her.  It is her romance with Hareton that brings her to a happy life and grows the charm of her personality.

References

Characters in Wuthering Heights